Le Mur (The Wall) may refer to:
 Le Mur (urban art), urban art spot in Paris, France, active since 2000
 Le Mur, structure in Fermont, Quebec, Canada
 The Wall (short story collection), 1939 book by Jean-Paul Sartre
 The Wall (1967 film), French drama film by Serge Roullet.
 The Wall (1998 film), Belgian drama film by Alain Berliner.
 The Wall (2012 documentary film), French documentary film by Sophie Robert.